Malaysia competed at the 2004 Summer Paralympics in Athens, Greece. The team included 19 athletes, 15 men and 4 women, but won no medals.

Sports

Archery

Men

|-
|align=left|Muhamad Salam Sidik
|rowspan="2" align=left|Men's individual W2
|618
|6
|W 153-145
|W 157-149
|L 100-100*
|colspan=3|did not advance
|-
|align=left|Zulkifli Mat Zin
|556
|28
|L 137-159
|colspan=5|did not advance
|}

Muhamad Salam Sidik's quarterfinal against Mario Oehme was decided by additional arrows: he lost 5 arrows to 8.

Athletics

Men's track

Judo

Men

Women

Powerlifting

Men

Women

Swimming

Men

Women

Wheelchair fencing

Wheelchair tennis

See also
Malaysia at the Paralympics
Malaysia at the 2004 Summer Olympics

References 

Nations at the 2004 Summer Paralympics
2004
Summer Paralympics